Rear Admiral Irwan Achmadi is a rear admiral in the Indonesian Navy who served as a Senior Officer (Indonesian: Perwira Tinggi) who since 18 November 2020, has carried out the mandate as Aspers Kasal. The last position of this two-star general was Commander of the Military Seaborne Command.

Career
He graduated from the Naval Academy in 1988. He has served various assignments both on warships and on staff.

His education and training later included Dikpespa, Seskoal, Sesko TNI (2013) and Lemhanas.

On 13 November 2017, the position of the Commander of the Eastern Fleet (Pangarmatim) has changed. Rear Admiral (Laksda) Darwanto, who was serving as Pangarmatim, have been replaced by Admiral Didik Setiyono. Ahead of the change of command, Armatim held an exit briefing at the Panti Tjahaja Timur Koarmatim Ujung Surabaya building. In this activity, Admiral Darwanto expressed his gratitude to all officers in the ranks of Armatim who sincerely and worked hard to help him as Pangarmatim by carrying out their duties.

Position 
 KRI Mongisidi Satkor
Communication Division Officer
Maritime Weapons Division Officer
Head of KRI Teluk Sibolga Depsops 
Implementing Officer of KRI Teluk Sibolga 
Implementing Officer of KRI Teluk Sabang 
Commander of KRI Teluk Sabang (2001—2002)
Danlanal Tarempa (2002)
Head of Sub-Directorate of Ditjiansta Ops Seskoal
Head of Subdiscomlekal
Dansatlinlamil Surabaya
Koarmatim Amphibious Ship Dansat
Lecturer at Sesko TNI
Asrena Pangkoarmabar
Naval Academy Planning and Development Director
Dirdok Kodiklatal
Kaskolinlamil (2017—2019)
Dankodikopsla (2019—2020)
Pankolinlamil (2020)
Kasal Aspers (2020—)

See also
Indonesian military ranks

References

Living people
Indonesian admirals
People from Majalengka Regency
Chiefs of Staff of the Indonesian Navy
Year of birth missing (living people)